The discography of the British singer-songwriter Lucie Silvas consists of four studio albums, two extended plays and twenty single releases.

Silvas debuted in 2000 with the song "It's Too Late", from the EP Forget Me Not; the single was not successful, charting at 62 in the UK music charts. Between this and the release of her next single, Silvas wrote songs for various other pop artists, including Gareth Gates and Rachel Stevens.

The release of "What You're Made of" in 2004 was her first successful single, charting at number 7 in the UK Official Top 40, and released in eight other countries. The release of her first studio album Breathe In met relative success, reaching platinum status in the UK where it reached number 11, and the Netherlands where it topped the charts at number one. 

Her second studio album The Same Side was initially released in October 2006 in Netherlands and later released 12th March 2007 in the UK, charting at number 5 in the Netherlands but only managed 62 in the UK. "Last Year" was the first single in the UK and peaked at #79, and the second single "Sinking In" was a download only release on 5th March 2007 coupled with a non-album track "Coming Out Wrong", it failed to chart.

Silvas stated that she was taking a more laid back approach and did not feel the need to prove her vocal abilities.

In 2015, Silvas released her third full-length studio album, Letters to Ghosts.

Albums

Studio albums

Extended plays

Singles

Guest singles

Music videos

Other contributions

Writing credits
The following songs were co-written by Silvas, and performed by other artists.

References 

Discographies of British artists
Pop music discographies
Rhythm and blues discographies